Venugopal Kuppanna Rajuk known as Venugopal K. R. (VKR) was born in Vannikula/Agnikula Kshatriya Family on 26th March 1956 in Bangalore. His father, Muniswamappa Kuppanna, a farmer worked in Indian Telephone Industries Bangalore, mother Narayanappa Muniyamma was a home maker. He was former Vice-Chancellor of Bangalore University, Principal of University Visvesvaraya College of Engineering (UVCE), He was also the Chairman, Department of Electronics and Communication, Computer Science Engineering and Information Science Engineering in University Visvesvaraya College of Engineering (UVCE). He has served UVCE as well as Bangalore University for the last five decades.
UVCE has been affiliated to Bangalore University since 1964. Dr. Venugopal K R was the Special Officer to the Government of Karnataka for Trifurcating Bangalore University. He submitted the report on 26 March 2015 for restructuring Bangalore University into Bangalore University, Bengaluru City University and Bengaluru North University and UVCE to be carved out as Center of Excellence on the model of Indian Institute of Technology. UVCE was granted autonomy by a bill tabled in Karnataka assembly and now UVCE is an autonomous institution with effect from 25 March 2022.

Education 
Prof Venugopal K R holds PhD in Economics from the Bangalore University, Bengaluru and also a PhD in Computer Science and Engineering from Indian Institute of Technology Madras (IITM), Chennai. He graduated from the Indian Institute Science (IISc), Bengaluru with an ME degree. He got his BE degree from UVCE in the field of Electronics and Communication. Along with these, he has also obtained degree in more than 10 fields including Economics, Finance, Law, Public Relations and so on. He has authored many books including Data Science and Computational Intelligence Computer, Networks and Intelligent Computing, Microprocessors X86 Programming, Mastering C, Introduction to Linux and Shell Scripting, C Test Your Aptitude, Programming with Pascal and C, Web Recommendation System.

Achievements 
Prof Venugopal K R has 1062 research publications, authored and edited 84 books and has been granted 37 patents, with over 6700 citations and google scholar h-index of 38  focusing mainly on the subjects of Economics and Computer Science. He has awarded PhDs to 30 students and has also guided informally more than 150 Research scholars. He has received many awards and titles including IEEE Fellow (2016) ACM Distinguished Educator Award, Anna University National Award, IEEE Best Branch Counsellor, Karnataka State Government Award, UP State National Award and others.

References 

Living people
1956 births
Bangalore University
IIT Madras alumni